Paróquia Santa Teresinha is a church located in São Paulo, Brazil. It was built in 1945.

References

Churches in São Paulo
Roman Catholic churches completed in 1945
20th-century Roman Catholic church buildings in Brazil